Novotumbagushevo (Yañı Tombağoş) is a rural locality (a village) in Starotumbagushevsky Selsoviet, Sharansky District, Bashkortostan, Russia. The population was 136 as of 2010. There is 1 street.

Geography 
Novotumbagushevo is located 10 km north of Sharan (the district's administrative centre) by road. Starotumbagushevo is the nearest rural locality.

References 

Rural localities in Sharansky District